U160 may refer to:

 German submarine U-160, one of two German submarines named U-160
 SCSI-160, an implementation of the SCSI (Small Computer System Interface) standards for data communication